While the Hungarian government has been planning since 2003 to replace the Hungarian forint with the euro, there is no target date and the forint is not part of the European Exchange Rate Mechanism (ERM II). An economic study in 2008 found that the adoption of the euro would increase foreign investment in Hungary by 30%, although current governor of the Hungarian National Bank and former Minister of the National Economy György Matolcsy said they did not want to give up the country's independence regarding corporate tax matters.

Adopting the euro

Under the socialist governments between 2002 and 2010
Hungary originally planned to adopt the euro as its official currency in 2007 or 2008. Later 1 January 2010 became the target date, but that date was abandoned because of an excessively high budget deficit, inflation, and public debt. For years, Hungary could not meet any of the Maastricht criteria. After the 2006 election, Prime Minister Ferenc Gyurcsány introduced austerity measures, causing protests in late 2006 and an economic slowdown in 2007 and 2008. However, in 2007, the deficit had been reduced to less than 5% (from 9.2%) and approached the 3% threshold in 2008. In 2008 analysts claimed that Hungary could join ERM II in 2010 or 2011 and so might adopt the euro in 2013, but more feasibly in 2014, or later, depending on eurozone crisis developments. On 8 July 2008, the then Finance Minister János Veres announced the first draft of a euro-adoption plan.

After the 2008 global financial crisis, the likelihood of a fast adoption seemed greater. Hungary received aid from the International Monetary Fund (IMF), the European Union and the World Bank. In October 2008 the head of Hungary's largest bank called for a special application to join the eurozone.

Ferenc Gyurcsány ran out of political capital in March 2009 to accept necessary measures. The exchange rate reached 317 forints to one euro on 6 March. Gyurcsány initiated a constructive motion of no confidence against himself on 21 March and nominated Minister for Development and economist Gordon Bajnai as his replacement. The socialist and liberal parties accepted him as the new prime minister, with an interim government for one year from 14 April. Bajnai's premiership brought new austerity measures in Hungary. Thus, they may keep the deficit under 4% in 2009 and the 2010 Budget calculations assumed 3.8%. The inflation outturn was near 3% as a result of the crisis, but because of the increase in VAT, it averaged 5% in the second half of the year. Because of the IMF loan, the public debt rose to nearly 80%. The central bank interest rate fell to 6.25% from 10.5% in 2009. The Bajnai government could not lead Hungary into the ERM II, and it stated that it had no plans to do so.

Under the conservative government from 2010
The centre-right soft Eurosceptic Fidesz won enough seats in the 2010 Hungarian parliamentary election to form a government on its own. Fidesz was not specific then about its economic priorities. Shortly after the formation of the new government, they announced their intention to keep the 2010 deficit at 3.8%. After more pressure, in September they also accepted a reduction to 3% in 2011. In 2010, Finance Minister György Matolcsy said they would discuss euro adoption in 2012. Mihály Varga, another member of the party, talked about possible euro adoption in 2014 or 2015.

However, in February 2011, Prime Minister Viktor Orbán made clear that he does not expect the euro to be adopted in Hungary before 2020. Later, Matolcsy also confirmed this statement. Orbán said the country was not yet ready to adopt the currency and they would not discuss the possibility until the public debt reached a 50% threshold. The public debt-to-GDP ratio was 81.0% when Orbán's 50% target was set in 2011, and it is currently forecast to decline to 73.5% in 2016.

In 2011, experts said that the earliest date that Hungary could adopt the euro was 2015.

When the countries of the eurozone adopted the Euro-Plus Pact on 25 March 2011, Hungary decided to go along with the United Kingdom, Sweden and the Czech Republic and chose not to join the pact. Matolcsy said that they could agree with the most of its contents, but did not want to give up the country's independence regarding corporate tax matters. As the Euro-Plus Pact does not feature any legal obligations - but only commitments to use various sets of voluntary tools to improve employment, competitiveness, fiscal responsibility and financial stability - joining this pact would not lead to a requirement for Hungary to abandon their current corporate tax method.

In April 2013, Viktor Orbán proclaimed euro adoption would not happen until the Hungarian purchasing power parity weighted GDP per capita had reached 90% of the eurozone average. According to Eurostat, this relative percentage rose from 57.0% in 2004 to 63.4% in 2014. If the same pace of "catching up" progress was to be expected in the future as in the past ten years (6.4% per decade), Hungary would only reach Orbán's 90% target and adopt the euro in 2056. Although, Hungary could potentially also reach Orbán's 90% target and adopt the euro in 2033, if being able for the upcoming period to sustain the same 1.4% of annual improvements in the figure as achieved from 2013 to 2014. Shortly after Orbán had been re-elected as Prime Minister for another four-year term in April 2014, the Hungarian Central Bank announced that they planned to introduce a new series of forint banknotes in 2018. In June 2015, Orbán declared that his government would no longer entertain the idea of replacing the forint with the euro in 2020, as was previously suggested, and instead expected the forint to remain "stable and strong for the next several decades", although, in July 2016, National Economy Minister Mihály Varga suggested that country could adopt the euro by the "end of the decade", but only if economic trends continue to improve and the common currency becomes more stable. No official target date has been set for euro adoption.

Public opinion
Public support for the euro in Hungary

The Maastricht criteria

Inflation
Inflation slowed down to 2.2% in 2006. However, after the austerity measures it was much higher than the criteria until the crisis. The crisis slowed it down to 2.9%, but in the end it was above the Maastricht criteria in 2009.  The annual inflation was 0.9% in October 2013.

Budget deficit
The budget deficit was 9.2% in the election year of 2006. After the austerity measures, it neared the 3% threshold in 2008. The deficit was planned to be 3.9% in 2009, but was ultimately above 4%. The 2010 budget planned 3.8%, but it also went over 4%. Hungary's general government deficit, excluding the effect of one-off measures, was 2.43% of GDP in 2011, lower than the 2.94% target and under the 3% threshold for the first time since 2004.  Hungary recorded a budget deficit of 1.9% in 2012, well below previous expectations. The budget deficit is expected to be under the 3% threshold in 2013 as well.

Public debt
Public debt accounted for 80.1% of GDP in 2010, above the 60% target. However, the EU might accept a Hungarian public debt which declines for at least 2 years.

Interest rate
The central bank's interest rate was raised by 3% to 11.5% in October 2008, because of the crisis. However, then it was lowered consecutively 14 times until 27 April 2010 down to 5.25%. Then it was raised 5 times until 21 December 2011 up to 7%. Since then the rate has declined 35 times,  the interest rate is 0.90%

ERM-II membership
As the conservative government in 2013 did not plan to adopt the euro before 2020, there is no discussion about a possible ERM II membership.

Convergence status

See also 
 
 Enlargement of the eurozone

Notes

References

Euro coins
Euro by country
Euro